Miniplane can refer to:

Per Il Volo Miniplane, an Italian paramotor
Smith Miniplane, an American biplane